Patty Griffin: Live from the Artist's Den is a 2008 live video album by American singer-songwriter Patty Griffin, her second live release.

Reception
Joseph Carver of PopMatters gave this release a seven out of 10, writing that this is a "pitch-perfect" introduction to Griffin, but "if there is any flaw on this collection, it would be that it tends to overstay its welcome". Jeff McCord of Texas Monthly praised the backing band and Griffin's vocals, calling this set "breathtaking".

Track listing
All songs written by Patty Griffin, except where noted
"You Never Get What You Want" – 5:50
"Stay on the Ride" – 5:39
"Trapeze" – 5:51
"Get Yourself Another Fool" (Frank Haywood and Ernest Tucker) – 3:43
"Burgundy Shoes" – 4:18
"Heavenly Day" – 3:44
"Moon Song" – 3:17
"No Bad News" – 5:35
"When It Don't Come Easy" – 5:09
"Love Throw a Line" – 5:12
"Crying Over" – 4:27
"Up on the Mountain (MLK Song)" – 5:00
"Sweet Lorraine" – 5:48
"Top of the World" – 6:52
Bonus tracks on the iTunes Store (all other tracks and track listing the same)
"J'irai La Voir Un Jour" – 3:04
"Standing" – 4:36

Personnel
Patty Griffin – acoustic guitar, vocals
Additional musicians
Bryn Davies – cello, double bass, vocals
J. D. Foster – electric bass, vocals
David Gold – viola
Doug Lancio – guitar, vocals
Michael Longoria – percussion
Ian McLagan – piano
Maxim Moston – violin
Jane Scarpantoni – cello
Antoine Silverman – violin
Technical personnel
Matthew Amonson – direction
Zachary Bako – photography
David Bronson – direction
Traci Goudie – art direction
Mark Lieberman – production
Alan Light – interview
David Pattillo – audio production
Carl Vitello – engineer
Tim Zeller – design
Jeff Zimbalist – film editor

See also
List of 2008 albums

References

External links
Page from The Artist's Den

2007 live albums
2007 video albums
ATO Records live albums
ATO Records video albums
Patty Griffin albums
Live video albums